Djurinaspis is an extinct genus of jawless fish which existed during the early Devonian period. It was originally described by Novitskaya in 1983. A new species, D. secunda, from Ukraine was described by Victor Voichyshyn in 2011.

References

Osteostraci genera
Fossil taxa described in 1983
Early Devonian fish of Europe